is a Japanese television jidaigeki (period drama) that was broadcast from 1978 to 1979. It is adapted from the 1978 film Shogun's Samurai starring Sonny Chiba, who reprises his role in the series.

Plot
After the death of Tokugawa Hidetada, his sons Tokugawa Iemitsu and Tokugawa Tadanaga began to fight over the inheritance. The Yagyu clan of Edo led by Yagyū Munenori supported the Iemitsu side, and Iemitsu was appointed third shogun.　But Nobutsuna Matsudaira feared Yagyu clan and tried not to let them hold great power. On the other hand, Shōshō Ayamaro Karasuma, who tried to divide the Tokugawa shogunate due to the conflict between Iemitsu and Tadaynaga, has not given up that hope.

Anti - Tokugawa shogunate forces appeared one after another, and challenged the battle for the Tokugawa shogunate. Yagyu Jubei and his subordinates defeated the enemies one by one as they were ordered by Nobutsuna Matsudaira and Yagyu Munenori, but Jubei gradually questions the politics of the Tokugawa shogunate.

Cast
 Shinichi Chiba as Jūbei Mitsuyoshi Yagyū
So Yamamura as Tajima-no-kami Munenori Yagyū
 Etsuko Shihomi as Akane Yagyū
 Yūki Meguro as Samon Tomonori Yagyū
 Hiroyuki Sanada as Sasuke
 Mikio Narita as Shōshō Ayamaro Karasuma
 Ryo Tamura as Iemitsu Tokugawa
 Etsushi Takahashi as Izu-no-kami Nobutsuna Matsudaira
 Jirō Yabuki as Fuchikari
 Seizō Fukumoto as Kitano
 Yumi Takigawa as Okuni
 Asao Koike as Negoro Sagenta
 Mariko Okada as Lady Kasuga

Episodes

See also
Shogun's Samurai (1978)

External links

References

1978 Japanese television series debuts
1970s drama television series
Jidaigeki television series
Cultural depictions of Yagyū clan
Cultural depictions of Tokugawa Iemitsu
Cultural depictions of Date Masamune
Television series set in the 17th century